Hydrocotyle hirta, commonly known as the hairy pennywort, is a species of flowering plant in the family Araliaceae native to Australia.

References

hirta
Flora of New South Wales
Flora of South Australia
Eudicots of Western Australia
Plants described in 1820